Lavern is a given name. Notable people with the name include:

Lavern Ahlstrom, retired provincial level politician and former leader of the Alberta Social Credit Party
LaVern Baker (1929–1997), American R&B singer
Alan LaVern Bean (1932–2018), American former naval officer and aviator, the fourth person to walk on the Moon
Lavern Corbin, American basketball player who was an NCAA All-American as a senior at Cal in 1929
LaVern Dilweg (1903–1968), professional football player, attorney, and U.S. Congressman from Wisconsin
Lavern Eve (born 1965), female track and field athlete from the Bahamas who competes in the javelin throw
Edward Lavern Johnstone (born 1954), retired Canadian ice hockey player
Ryan Lavern (born 1987), American professional baseball player in the Atlanta Braves organization
LaVern W. Parmley (1900–1980), the fifth general president of the Primary of The Church of Jesus Christ of Latter-day Saints (LDS Church)
Lavern Roach (1925–1950), boxer from Texas who was Ring Magazine's Rookie-of-the-Year in 1947
Lavern Spencer (born 1984), Saint Lucian high jumper
LaVern Torgeson (1929–2015), American football linebacker

See also
LaVern Gibson Championship Cross Country Course, in Terre Haute, Indiana was dedicated October 17, 1997
La Vergne (disambiguation)
Lavergne (disambiguation)
Laverna
Laverne (disambiguation)
Lavernhe
Lavernia (disambiguation)